"Gas" is the second episode of the first series of British sitcom Bottom. It was first broadcast on 24 September 1991.

Synopsis
After nearly killing the gas man, Richie and Eddie must remove an illegal gas connection from next door without disturbing their violent neighbour.

Plot
The episode begins with Eddie and Richie playing cards in their flat with all their gas appliances turned on at full blast. During the game, it is revealed that their gas pipe is not attached to their meter, but instead to next door's. There is a knock at the door, which Richie answers. He is distressed to reveal that it is the gas man who is there to read their meter. Richie distracts him by pretending to be insane, whilst Eddie switches off the gas.

The gas man comes in and reads the meter, despite Eddie and Richie's attempts to stop him. He informs them that one of the residents has complained about a very high gas bill and he is checking all the meters on the street. He reads the meter and is puzzled as to why it reads zero. Eddie and Richie attempt to convince him it is because they do not use gas as they do not know what it is. They attempt to stall him by making "the best tea in London" with cold water and forcing him to drink it in order to clock off before he has a chance to inspect next door's meter. When their stalling tactics fail, Richie repeatedly punches the gas man and Eddie beats him with a frying pan, knocking him unconscious. Believing that they killed him, they attempt to dispose of the body by hiding it under the carpet, trying to eat it and trying to throw it on top of a passing bus (writing in his log that he was pursuing his hobby of "bus surfing"). Before they have a chance to throw him out of the window, the gas man regains consciousness and Richie and Eddie send him on his way whilst very disorientated.

Eddie and Richie try to get into their neighbour's flat, but Mr Rottweiler is an angry, hostile man who loathes them. To further complicate matters, Rottweiler's girlfriend is staying with him and he does not want to be disturbed. Unable to simply walk into Rottweiler's flat, Eddie and Richie break through the connecting wall with a sledgehammer. Aiming for the kitchen, they fail and instead break into Rottweiler's bedroom, where he and his girlfriend are sleeping. Eddie goes to the kitchen to remove the gas pipe, while Richie stays in the bedroom attempting to clean up the rubble and later lecherously staring at Rottweiler's girlfriend. Meanwhile, Eddie becomes distracted while eating most of Rottweiler's food.

Having eaten much of the contents of the fridge, Eddie sets about his work, but botches the job and causes a huge gas leak in the kitchen. Richie finishes up and goes to get Eddie, but is nearly knocked over by an enormous, fiery explosion in the corridor. Richie runs into the destroyed kitchen, where a badly-burnt Eddie claims that he had simply attempted to "burn off" the excess gas. Eddie and Richie try to escape out of the front door, but are confronted by the confused gas man. They successfully escape through the hole in the bedroom wall and congratulate themselves on escaping Rottweiler's flat. Having discovered his kitchen on fire, Rottweiler is informed by the gas man that Eddie and Richie had been in his flat moments earlier. The episode ends with Rottweiler breaking through the hole in the wall and strangling Eddie and Richie for their actions.

References

External links

Bottom (TV series)
1991 British television episodes